The Iron Front was a German paramilitary organization in the Weimar Republic which consisted of social democrats, trade unionists, and liberals. Its main goal was to defend liberal democracy against totalitarian ideologies on the far-right and far-left. The Iron Front chiefly opposed the Sturmabteilung (SA) wing of the Nazi Party and the  wing of the Communist Party of Germany. Formally independent, it was intimately associated with the Social Democratic Party of Germany (SPD). The Three Arrows, originally designed for the Iron Front, became a well-known social democratic symbol representing resistance against monarchism, Nazism, and Marxism-Leninism during the parliamentary elections in November 1932. The Three Arrows were later adopted by the SPD itself.

History 
The Iron Front was formed on 16 December 1931 in the Weimar Republic by the Social Democratic Party (SPD), along with the Allgemeiner Deutscher Gewerkschaftsbund (ADGB), the Reichsbanner Schwarz-Rot-Gold, and workers' sport clubs. The Iron Front chiefly opposed the paramilitary organisations of the fascist National Socialist German Workers Party (NSDAP) and the Communist Party of Germany (KPD). Its initial purpose was to counter the right-wing Harzburg Front. The organization sought to engage the old Reichsbanner, the SPD youth organization, and labour, and liberal groups as a united front. The SPD rallied to the Iron Front, held mass demonstrations, armed themselves, and fought the Nazi SA and Communist RFB in the streets. This was more than the SPD leaders wanted, but SPD workers grew increasingly militant in their resistance against the authoritarian and totalitarian movements threatening the Weimar Republic.

The Iron Front was regarded as an anti-communist and "social fascist terror organisation" by the KPD, who regarded the SPD as their main adversary. In response to the formation of the Iron Front, the KPD founded its own activist wing, Antifaschistische Aktion (Antifa), which opposed the social democrat SPD and the fascist NSDAP.

On January 30, 1933, the day Hitler was appointed Chancellor, the KPD asked the Iron Front, the SPD, the general trade union association ADGB and their organisations, and the Reichsbanner Schwarz-Rot-Gold to declare a general strike against Hitler. The Iron Front declined, issued a call on February 2 to "all comrades of the Reichsbanner and the Iron Front", warning against participating in "wild actions organised by irresponsible people", and exhorted members to "turn all Iron Front events into powerful rallies for freedom".

On March 3, the Iron Front planned a march in Kassel, but was hindered by regular police. On May 2, all trade unions, with which the Iron Front was closely allied, were finally abolished, together with all trade union structures. Until the mid 1930s and in some cases until the war years, some local branches of the Iron Front and the former trade union organisations continued with resistance, mostly by spreading leaflets, organizing secret meetings, and carrying out acts of sabotage.

Its logo, the Three Arrows (pointing southwest) was designed by Sergei Chakhotin, former assistant to the physiologist Ivan Pavlov in 1931. Designed so as to be able to easily cover Nazi swastikas, the meaning of the three arrows has been variously interpreted. The present-day Reichsbanner association says the arrows of the logo stood for the SPD, the trade unions, and the Reichsbanner Schwarz-Rot-Gold, as well as for the political, economic, and physical strength of the working class. The symbol was used on a November 1932 Reichstag election poster of the SPD to represent opposition to the Nazi Party, the Communist Party, and the monarchist wing of the Centre Party.

About its formation, Karl Höltermann, chairman of the Reichsbanner, commented: "The year 1932 will be our year, the year of victory of the republic over its opponents. Not one day nor one hour more do we want to remain on the defensive. We attack! Attack on the whole line! We must be part of the general offensive. Today we call - tomorrow we strike!"

Legacy

The Three Arrows became a symbol of the social democratic resistance against the totalitarian ideologies of Nazism and Soviet State Socialism. More recently, the symbol has been appropriated by American anti-fascist movements, along with flags historically derived from the German Communist Party's Antifaschistische Aktion. Antifa opposed the Iron Front, whom they regarded as bourgeois and fascist, as the Three Arrows logo was used to represent resistance against Antifa's affiliated party, the KPD as well.

The Iron Front flag has been adopted by supporters of MLS team Portland Timbers and frequently seen at their games. Major League Soccer banned the flag in 2019 as part of a crackdown on "political symbols," although the league walked back the ban weeks later.

See also 

 Reichsbanner Schwarz-Rot-Gold
 Three Arrows
 Weimar Coalition

Footnotes

Further reading
 

1931 establishments in Germany
Liberal organizations
History of liberalism
Anti-fascism in Germany
Anti-fascist organisations in Germany
Anti-communist organizations in Germany
Defunct political party alliances in Germany
German resistance to Nazism
Organizations established in 1931
Social Democratic Party of Germany
Political parties established in 1931
Weimar Republic